Robert Parkinson Tomlinson (20 May 1881 – 3 June 1943) was a British corn merchant and Liberal politician.

Family and education 
Tomlinson was born at Poulton-le-Fylde  in Lancashire, the son of William and Agnes Ormond Tomlinson. He was educated at Poulton-le-Fylde Grammar School and Claremont College, Blackpool. He never married. In religion Tomlinson was a Methodist.

Career 
Tomlinson set himself up in business and founded Parkinson and Tomlinson, corn and oatmeal millers and seed merchants in The Fylde district. He was regarded as an expert on agricultural questions.

Politics

Local politics 
Perhaps drawn to Liberalism through his nonconformist religious beliefs, Tomlinson took an early interest in public affairs. At the age of just 24 years he was elected to Poulton-le-Fylde Urban District Council and remained a member until the time of his death. On six occasions he was Chairman of the Council and for thirty years was Chairman of the Finance Committee. He also sat on many other committees.

Other public appointments 
Tomlinson served as a Justice of the Peace in Poulton-le-Fylde. He was sometime Vice-Chairman of Fylde Water Board, Chairman of Preston, Garstang and Fylde Joint Hospital Board, a member of Lancashire County Licensing Committee, a member of the Quarter Sessions Appeals Committee, and a member of the Lancashire Agricultural Wages Board.

Parliamentary candidate
First stood for Parliament at the 1923 general election as Liberal candidate in Fylde in Lancashire but was beaten by 3,280 votes in a straight fight with sitting Conservative MP Lord Stanley.

1928 Lancaster by-election
He was next a candidate at a by-election at Lancaster on 9 February 1928 caused by elevation to peerage of Sir Gerald Strickland Tomlinson won by a majority of 1,829 over his Tory opponent  Herwald Ramsbotham with Labour in third place.  Turnout was 82% And Tomlinson overturned a Conservative majority from the previous election of 4,158.

1929–1935
Tomlinson was unable to hold the seat at the 1929 general election however, with Ramsbotham gaining it for the Conservatives, albeit by the small margin of 437 votes. Tomlinson did not contest the 1931 general election but did try again in 1935, this time finding himself again in second place although this time behind by 13,578.

Death 
Tomlinson died at Cliffdale, Thurnham, in Lancashire on 3 June 1943, aged 62 years.

References

External links 

1881 births
1943 deaths
Liberal Party (UK) MPs for English constituencies
National Liberal Party (UK, 1922) politicians
UK MPs 1924–1929
People from Poulton-le-Fylde
Politics of Lancashire
British Methodists